Ophyx chionopasta is a moth in the family Erebidae. Endemic to Papua, Indonesia, it was first described by George Hampson in 1926.

References

Ophyx
Moths described in 1926
Moths of Indonesia